Akebono Rock is a substantial area of exposed rock just east of the mouth of Akebono Glacier on the coast of Queen Maud Land. Mapped from surveys and air photos by the Japanese Antarctic Research Expedition, 1957–1962, who also gave the name.

References
 

Rock formations of Queen Maud Land
Prince Olav Coast